Stuart Machin (born 1971) is a British business executive and the Chief Executive (CEO) of Marks & Spencer. He became CEO on 25 May 2022 when Steve Rowe stood down after six years. Machin is responsible for day-to-day leadership, with Katie Bickerstaffe as co-CEO in charge of online operations and data. Reuters called this an "unconventional leadership structure".

Education
Machin joined the Retail Management scheme at Sainsbury's when he was 18. Later in his career he attended the Harvard Business School advanced management program (AMP) in 2013.

Career
Machin started his career in retailing as a teenage shelf stacker at a Sainsbury's Savacentre in Hempstead Valley Shopping Centre outside Gillingham, Kent. He worked for Sainsbury's, Tesco and Asda in increasingly senior roles, followed by ten years in Australia working for the Wesfarmers conglomerate as operations director of Coles and managing director of Target Australia. He resigned as MD of Coles in April 2016 because of accounting irregularities that he was unaware of but "they happened on my watch". He then became CEO of Steinhoff UK, before being headhunted to join M&S as Managing Director of its Food division.

M&S
Machin joined M&S in May 2018. According to the Retail Gazette, at the time, M&S Food had been underperforming, and Machin managed to get it "firing on all cylinders again" by improving the product offering, pricing, and making it somewhere to do a full weekly shop, not just buy occasional treats. In June 2021, M&S Food opened its sixteenth renewal store at Sears Retail Park in Solihull, West Midlands, which saw the Renewal concept expanding into M&S's hospitality offer for the first time. By the end of the 21/22 financial year, M&S had reached the total of 40 renewal stores.

In February 2019, M&S announced it had struck a deal with Ocado that would enable M&S food products to be sold online for the first time. The deal would see M&S pay £750m for a 50% stake in a joint venture called Ocado Retail Limited, replacing Ocado's previous retail partner Waitrose which had recently started its own standalone food delivery proposition. As part of the deal, Machin became a Non-Executive Director of the new joint venture. Machin described the move as 'transformative' for M&S Food, which 'brings to life our strategy of protecting the magic whilst modernising the rest' - a slogan for which Machin would become well-known. Ocado began selling M&S products on 1 September 2020.

In May 2021, Machin was given the additional role of joint chief operating officer (COO), alongside Katie Bickerstaffe. This saw Machin assume responsibility for HR, IT, Property & Store Development, and Central & Store Operations - in addition to his role as Food MD 

In March 2022, it was announced that Machin would succeed Steve Rowe as CEO of M&S, while Bickerstaffe would become co-CEO. Machin assumed his new role on 25 May 2022 and also joined the board.

Upon becoming CEO, Machin launched "Straight to Stuart", a scheme that allows staff to share views and ideas with him for improving M&S. Two ideas quickly adopted by Machin were Megan Tomkies' suggestion that staff with a stammer or speech impediment could wear a corresponding symbol on their lapel badges, and  Bowel cancer survivor Cara Hoofe's suggestion to have Bowel Cancer symptoms listed on toilet roll packaging and in store toilets.

In August 2022, Machin said that London's Oxford Street was in danger of becoming a "dinosaur district destined for extinction", and has been vocal in support of the controversial planned demolition and redevelopment of M&S's flagship store there, close to Marble Arch.

In September 2022, M&S announced it had completed the acquisition of its long-term food logistics provider Gist in a deal worth up to £255m  The acquisition, which had long been sought after by M&S, was spearheaded by Machin who described it as ‘a key milestone in the history of our business', noting how it would allow the retailer to take complete ownership of its food supply chain for the first time in its history 

In October 2022 M&S hosted a capital markets day where Machin outlined to investors his strategy to ‘reshape M&S for growth’. According to Retail Week, this strategy encompassed everything from ‘structural cost reduction’ and ‘faster churn of its store estate’ to ‘improving digital engagement with customers and enhancing the Sparks loyalty programme and M&S app’. Retail Week said that these measures were evidence of M&S 'building on the foundations left by [former CEO] Steve Rowe and 'taking important steps for serving customers better and securing growth. As part of his cost reduction plans, Machin suggested that M&S might ‘vacate or downsize’ its central London head office space upon expiry of its lease in 2027 – noting that this would also allow colleagues to work more flexibly and help M&S attract talent all over the UK

On 1 November 2022 Machin was invited to guest edit the Business section of The Sun newspaper. His top story of the day was M&S investing in its value proposition and locking the prices of '100 everyday staples' until the end of January 2023 

On 9 November 2022 M&S reported its half-year results for the 26 weeks ended 1 October 2022. Machin said that trading in the first half of the year had been 'robust', with both Food and Clothing sales growing ahead of the market. Writing in Fashion trade title Drapers, Machin called out M&S's Clothing division for its 'standout performance', which he said was driven by improvements to its 'style and value credentials.' 

In January 2023 M&S announced an investment of almost £500m into its store estate, pledging to open 100 new stores and create 3,400 jobs by April 2026, with several of these stores to open in empty former Debenhams sites. In a blog published in Retail Week, Machin explained the move was part of M&S’s ‘store rotation programme’ which is all about having ‘the right stores, in the right place, with the right space’ and follows the retailer’s previously-announced ambition to reduce its number of ‘full line’ stores selling Food, Clothing & Home from 247 to 180 stores by 2026.   News of M&S’s investment in its store estate came just days after the retailer announced its Christmas trading results. According to the Guardian, M&S enjoyed ‘a bumper Christmas’, achieving its best ever Food sales and biggest share of the Clothing & Homeware market since 2015.

In February 2023 Machin became the latest senior retail figure to call on the Government to reform the National Apprenticeship Levy. Writing in his monthly LinkedIn newsletter 'Straight From Stuart', Machin branded the levy 'not fit for purpose' and 'a tax on opportunity.'  This followed similar comments from BRC Chief Executive Helen Dickinson and Tesco Chief Executive Ken Murphy.

Personal life
Machin lives in south London, and his hobbies are music, theatre, politics, food, fashion, and walking his dog, Kostas. 

Machin is an active user of social media, sharing regular business and personal updates with his thousands of followers. This includes a monthly newsletter on LinkedIn called 'Straight From Stuart'.

In February 2023, Machin hit the press after being pictured at a dinner with celebrity friend Dame Joan Collins. It was reported that Collins was almost knocked over by a cyclist on the way to the dinner, which also included Christopher Biggins.

References

Living people
British retail chief executives
British businesspeople in retailing
Marks & Spencer people
Sainsbury's people
Tesco people
Walmart people
Target Corporation people
Chief operating officers

Year of birth missing (living people)